Martina Müller was the defending champion from 2001, but lost in the first round.

Magüi Serna won the second straight title in two weeks, having won the 2003 Estoril Open in the previous week.

Seeds

  Iva Majoli (second round)
  Magüi Serna (champion)
  Alicia Molik (final)
  Henrieta Nagyová (first round)
  Virginie Razzano (second round)
  Klára Koukalová (second round)
  Cristina Torrens Valero (first round)
  Antonella Serra Zanetti (second round)

Draw

Finals

Top half

Bottom half

References

Tippmix Budapest Grand Prix - Singles
Budapest Grand Prix